Piramal is a surname. Notable people with the surname include:

Ajay Piramal, Indian businessman
Gita Piramal, Indian writer 
Swati Piramal, industrialist

See also
Piramal Group, diversified business conglomerate
Piramal Glass, glass packaging company

Hindu surnames